On 26 February 2023, an unidentified armed Palestinian fatally shot two Israeli settlers in their car in Huwara, a town south of Nablus in the Israeli-occupied West Bank. As of 27 February, the shooter remains at large. Following the shooting, Israeli settlers carried out revenge attacks on Palestinians, which have killed at least one Palestinian and injured around 100 others.

Background 

On 22 February 2023, the Israeli military entered the Palestinian city of Nablus, which is nominally in Area A of the West Bank and therefore under both civilian and security control of the Palestinian National Authority. The Israeli incursion was conducted in search of militants, and led to clashes which killed eleven Palestinians – seven militants (including the wanted three) and four civilians.

Shooting

Incident 
On 26 February 2023, four days after the incursion in Nablus, an unidentified Palestinian shot and killed two Israelis in a car near the Einbus intersection along Highway 60 in Huwara south of Nablus. The shooter, who remains at large, shot the two Israelis with an M16 rifle while they were driving and then fled the scene on foot.

Assailant 
No Palestinian faction has claimed responsibility for the shooting. On March 7, the suspected Hamas gunman who carried out the shooting, 49-year-old Abdel Fattah Hussein Kharousha, was killed along with five other Palestinians during an Israeli raid in Jenin.

Victims 
The two Israelis killed in the shooting were brothers named Hillel Menachem Yaniv and Yagel Ya’acov Yaniv. They were from the Har Brakha  settlement, and were described as yeshiva students. One of the brothers had just completed his service in the Israeli Navy.

Subsequent riots 

Later on the same day, groups of Israeli settlers rioted in the region, carrying out revenge attacks. One Palestinian man was fatally shot in the abdomen in neighboring Za'tara. An analysis by journalists for +972 magazine of 14 videos of the assault conducted by 40-50 settlers, who had returned to Za'tara after being repulsed the first time,  concluded that the simultaneous  attack on Za’atara in which Sameh Aqtesh was shot dead was conducted under Israeli army escort . In Huwara itself, ninety-eight Palestinians were injured as settlers torched Palestinian homes.

See also 
Timeline of the Israeli–Palestinian conflict in 2023

References

2023 mass shootings in Asia
2023 murders in Asia
2023 in the State of Palestine
21st-century mass murder in Asia
February 2023 crimes in Asia
Mass murder in 2023
Terrorist incidents in the West Bank in 2023
Ethnic riots
Palestinian terrorism
Nablus Governorate